Davide Rossi (born 7 August 1970) is an Italian violinist, string arranger, composer, conductor and a record producer, perhaps best known for having been the violinist, guitar and keytar-player for the British electronic music duo Goldfrapp from 2000 until 2013, and for his large contribution of electric violin parts and for all the string arrangements on all Coldplay's albums since Viva la Vida or Death and All His Friends, and The Verve's album Forth.

Biography

Early career – Italy

Rossi began playing music at the age of four and, encouraged by his mother, started to study violin at the age of ten. He entered the Conservatory Giuseppe Verdi of Torino in 1981 and began studying under the guidance of Maestro Ivan Krivensky, who remains his violin teacher to this day. Rossi received his Diploma in 1992 at the homonymous school in Milan.

Alongside formal classical studies he started to work with bands at the age of fifteen, mainly in the Turin area. After his Diploma in 1992 he joined Mau Mau full-time; a folk-rock band from Turin with whom he recorded many albums and toured most of Europe and the Middle-East. Other Italian bands that featured his work are Casino Royale, Afterhours, La Crus, Cristina Donà, Bluvertigo and the singer songwriter Vinicio Capossela.

Robert Fripp – Guitar Craft

In 1990 Rossi became a student of legendary guitarist Robert Fripp and followed intensively his Guitar Craft courses all over the world for a period of nearly four years. In 1995 he moved to the UK and began a period of study where he completed a BA in Composition at Bath Spa University College and a MSC in Digital Music Technology at Keele University. In 1999 he attended a music course by German composer Karlheinz Stockhausen in Kürten, near Cologne, Germany. This two week period, coupled with Guitar Craft, was highly influential on Rossi's future musical career.

Goldfrapp

In 2000 Rossi was invited by musician Will Gregory, whom he had met two years previously, to join his new band Goldfrapp. Since then Rossi has been part of all the live incarnations of the band, touring most of the world during the Felt Mountain Tour (2000–2002), Black Cherry Tour (2003–2004), Supernature Tour (2005–2006), Seventh Tree Tour (2008) and Head First Tour (2010). Although before Head First he has never played on any Goldfrapp's studio albums, he has recorded several b-sides, acoustic and live recordings of the band and a live DVD. In September 2013 Rossi announced that the performance at the Beacon Theatre in New York City was going to be his last with the band, in order to pursue his own arranging and composing career and the increasing commitment with his own band Black Submarine.

Coldplay

From the autumn of 2006 until February 2008, Rossi's career focussed mainly on studio work and string arranging. At the time of writing this is once again his focus. He uses his acoustic violins, violas, cellos and contrabass to re-create a whole orchestra. His work is featured in six songs of the Coldplay album Viva la Vida or Death and All His Friends, produced by Brian Eno, Markus Dravs and Rik Simpson. "Violet Hill", first single released by the band on iTunes, features a soundscapes intro-like, which originally was an improvisation that Rossi and keyboard player Jon Hopkins did together during an early session with the band at their studio in London. Others songs where Rossi's electric violin can be heard are: Life In Technicolor, 42, Yes and Strawberry Swing (the chunky bass groove, didgeridoo's like that comes a little while after the beginning of the song, is one of the many examples of the sound of his Violectra). In Yes, the electric violin takes shape as a John Cale-ish riff almost monotonically throughout the verses, while full and sometimes Arabic string arrangements are heavily featured at the beginning and during the song's breaks. "Viva La Vida" however, is the tune where Rossi's work is featured in its fullest. His strings are the driving force throughout the whole song: with an unforgettable opening loop supporting Martin's voice, that builds in the choruses where the symphonic power of the orchestra is in full effect.

In November 2008, Coldplay released an EP titled Prospekt's March, in which Rossi contributes to the songs: Life in Technicolor II, Rainy Day and Prospekt's March/Poppyfields.

December 2010 saw Rossi back in the studio with Coldplay, to start on a yet very long session for the album Mylo Xyloto, which was released in October 2011. His string arrangements are presents on 10 tracks of the album: Paradise, Charlie Brown, Us Against the World, U.F.O., Every Teardrop is a Waterfall, Up in Flames, A Hopeful Transmission, Princess of China, Don't Let It Break Your Heart and Up with the Birds.

In July 2011, Coldplay released the Every Teardrop Is a Waterfall EP where Rossi is present in the title song and on a B side called Moving To Mars.

Although Coldplay has an unspoken rule of not allowing any extra musician on stage besides the 4 members of the band, Rossi's strings feature live heavily by means of backing tape. Coldplay half-broke that rule allowing Rossi to perform 'in shadow' and just behind them on the song A Message 2010, at the Hope For Haiti benefit concert, which took place in the UK and US as a TV marathon gig. The song was later released on iTunes. Rossi did also some occasional appearances with Chris Martin during some charity events; in November 2006, for the Mencap Charity Concert at the Union Chapel in London and in October 2009 at the Bridge School Benefit in San Francisco, where Rossi performed also with Neil Young the song Comes a Time.

The Verve
During the early part of 2008, Rossi met The Verve's guitarist Nick McCabe who invited him to play on a session for what was would become the album Forth, later released in the August of the same year. Rossi' s contribution to this album can be heard in six tracks. In Love Is Noise, he contributes, with the lower strings of his electric violin, to the daunting sound of the famous loop upon which the whole song is then developed. Sit And Wonder is a ground-breaking collaboration of 'noises' with Nick McCabe, where guitar and electric violin play a dance of interweaving acid sounds and harmonies. More classic string arrangements can be heard on songs like Valium Skies, Judas,  I See Houses and Rather Be. Rossi has also performed with the Verve during several live and TV shows of their latest summer campaign. Some of them include Glastonbury and the V Festival.

Röyksopp
March 2009 sees the release of another important collaboration for Rossi. Norwegian band Röyksopp features his string arrangements in four of the eleven track of their new album Junior. These are: The Girl and the Robot, Röyksopp Forever, You Don't Have a Clue and Silver Cruiser.

From the same session Röyksopp released in 2010 Senior, in which Rossi is featured on the song "Senior Living".

Rossi has also appeared live with the band on various concerts around Europe and the UK in 2009.

Other collaborations
Rossi's work as arranger and producer has been featured on records of artists such as Siouxsie, Dido, Jon Hopkins, The Proclaimers, Chris Martin, Eros Ramazzotti, Alicia Keys, Moby, Jazmine Sullivan, Trentemøller, Zucchero, Rihanna, Duran Duran, Jack Savoretti,and many others.

Discography

Awards

Grammy Awards

References

External links

Living people
1970 births
Italian violinists
Male violinists
Italian composers
Italian male composers
Alumni of Bath Spa University
Alumni of Keele University
21st-century violinists
21st-century Italian male musicians